Kallai may refer to:

 Kallayi, a town in Kerala, India
 Kallai River, a river of Kerala, India
 Kallai, Poonch District, Jammu and Kashmir, India

See also
 Kallai Mattum, a song
 Kállai, a surname
 Kallay